Tufted fescue is a common name for several grasses in the genus Festuca and may refer to:
 
 Festuca amethystina, native to Europe
 Festuca contracta, native to areas in the Southern Ocean

See also 
 Festuca occidentalis, a tufted fescue known as western fescue